Solar Films Inc Oy is a Finnish film production company, which was founded in 1995. Solar Films is one of the country's leading production companies in feature films and TV productions. Solar Films' productions have won a total of 41 Jussi Awards, and three Oscar nominations.

Besides feature films and television drama, Solar Films have also produced thousands of hours of TV entertainment for Finnish TV channels. Solar Films is owned by Egmont and Markus Selin. The company's CEO is Jukka Helle. In 2009, Solar Films bought the majority of production company Bronson Club. Solar Films have collaborated with European production houses such as Taska Film, Zentropa, the Icelandic Film Company, Maipo Film, and Ugly Duckling Films. The films produced by Solar Films have been distributed in over 50 countries worldwide.

External links 
 Official site

References 

Film production companies of Finland
Entertainment companies established in 1995
1995 establishments in Finland